Rancho Valle de San José (also called "Valle de San José y Corralitos") was a   Mexican land grant in present-day Alameda County, California. It was made up of the former pasture land belonging to Mission San José.

It was given in 1839  by Governor Juan Alvarado  to Antonio Maria Pico, Agustín Bernal (1797–1872),  Juan Pablo Bernal (1810–1878), and Antonio Suñol (in conjunction with his wife María Dolores Bernal de Suñol).   The grant encompassed present-day Sunol and Pleasanton.

History
The eleven square league grant was given to four children of José Joaquín Bernal (1762–1837) and María Josefa Daría Sánchez (1760–1858).  José Joaquín Bernal, a member of the 1776 De Anza Expedition, was a soldier at the Presidio of San Francisco and the Pueblo of San José, and grantee of  Rancho Santa Teresa.

Antonio María Pico (1809–1869), son of José Dolores Pico, was the grantee of Rancho Pescadero and married María del Pilar Bernal (1812–1882) in 1831.  Pico sold his one fourth share of Rancho El Valle de San José to Juan Pablo Bernal.

The Bernals only moved to the rancho after the gold rush to protect their interests from squatters.  Agustín Bernal moved to his portion of the Rancho and built an adobe in 1850.

María Dolores Bernal married Antonio Suñol (1796–1865). With the cession of California to the United States following the Mexican-American War, the 1848 Treaty of Guadalupe Hidalgo provided that the land grants would be honored.  As required by the Land Act of 1851, a claim for Rancho Valle de San José was filed with the Public Land Commission in 1852, and the grant was patented to Antonio Suñol in 1865. 

John W. Kottinger (1820–1892), an immigrant from Austria, arrived in California in 1849.  He married María del Refugio Angustias Bernal, the daughter of Juan Pablo Bernal, and they were given  from Rancho Valle de San José. Kottinger is one of the founders of Pleasanton, California.

By 1874, the Spring Valley Water Company had bought most of the land and water rights.

Historic sites of the Rancho
  Kottinger Adobe Barn.  John Kottinger’s 1852 adobe barn is the oldest building in downtown Pleasanton.

References

 

Valle de San Jose (Bernal)
Valle de San Jose
Pleasanton, California

El Camino Viejo
Valle de San Jose